Hayesville is an unincorporated community in Pickaway County, in the U.S. state of Ohio.

History
A post office called Hayesville Station was in operation from 1878 until 1879. Hayesville had two stores, a blacksmith shop, and grain elevator.

References

Unincorporated communities in Pickaway County, Ohio
Unincorporated communities in Ohio